Mian Volan or Meyan Velan or Mian Velan may refer to:

Mian Volan-e Olya
Mian Volan-e Sofla
Mian Volan-e Vosta